Star Trek Technical Manuals are a number of both official and fan-produced works detailing the technology of the fictional Star Trek universe; most pertain to starship design, though others target equipment used in the various Star Trek television series and films.

Franz Joseph Schnaubelt published the original Star Fleet Technical Manual in 1975; since then other manuals have been created by fans and professional artists alike to chronicle the increasing variety of both canon and noncanon vessels and gear. Trek fan Shane Johnson created the official Pocket Books works Mr. Scott's Guide to the Enterprise and Worlds of the Federation after making his own self-produced blueprints.

Two manual creators moved from making blueprints to helping shape the look of the shows themselves. Rick Sternbach became an official illustrator for the franchise's first theatrical release, and later worked for the series Next Generation, Deep Space Nine and Voyager; he went on to contribute to the Next Generation and Deep Space Nine technical manuals from Pocket Books. Geoffery Mandel, who helped create Pocket Books's interstellar reference work Star Trek: Star Charts, worked as scenic artist on the Voyager and Enterprise series as well as the film Star Trek: Insurrection. 

For details on out-of-universe reference books see List of Star Trek reference books.
The following list is incomplete.

Star Trek Technical Manuals

Reference material by year and title

1970s

1980s

1990s

2000s

Unknown 

 
Technical manuals
Star Trek technical